Kulabdam Sor Jor Piek-U-Thai (กุหลาบดำ ส.จ.เปี๊ยกอุทัย) is a Thai Muay Thai fighter.

Biography

In 2016 Kulabdam became very popular at the Channel 7 Stadium with a streak of knockouts.

For his results during the year 2017 he received the most prestigious distinction in muay thai the Sports Writers Association Fighter of the Year Award.

In February 2018 he won the Lumpinee 135lbs title against Genji Umeno in Tokyo.

ONE Championship
In September 2019, Kulabadam made his debut for ONE Championship at ONE Championship: Immortal Triumph. He scored a knockdown in the first round and won a unanimous decision against Bobo Sacko in Ho Chi Minh City, Vietnam.

He faced Sangmanee Sor Tienpo on August 21, 2020 in the ONE Bantamweight Muay Thai Tournament Semi-Final. Kulabdam knocked out Sangmanee in the first round to advance to the Tournament Final, where was set to face Saemapetch Fairtex. Soon after, it was announced that Saemapetch was injured and Kulabdam would face Rodlek P.K. Saenchaimuaythaigym in the Final.

On August 28, 2020, Kulabdam was dominated in the ONE Bantamweight Muay Thai Tournament Final, getting knocked down twice, and lost by unanimous decision to Rodlek.

On December 8, 2020 Kulabdam faced Shadow Thor.Thepsutin at the Lumpinee Stadium Brithday show. He won the fight by knockout in the second round.

Kulabdam faced Saemapetch Fairtex on May 28, 2021 at ONE Championship: Full Blast. He lost by first-round knockout via punch to the body.

Kulabdam faced Sangmanee P.K.Saenchai on January 27, 2023, at ONE Lumpinee 2. He won the fight via unanimous decision.

Kulabdam faced Muangthai P.K.Saenchai on March 17, 2023, at ONE Friday Fights 9. He lost the fight via knockout in the third round.

Personal life
Kulabdam has a younger brother who is also a fighter named Tai Sor-Jor Piekuthai.

Titles and accomplishments

Lumpinee Stadium
 2018 Lumpinee Stadium 135lbs Champion
 2018 Lumpinee Stadium Fight of the Year (June 5 vs Muangthai PKSaenchaimuaythaigym)
 2019 Lumpinee Stadium 140lbs Champion
 2019 Lumpinee Stadium Fight of the Year (May 10 vs Nuenglanlek Jitmuangnon)
Professional Boxing Association of Thailand (PAT) 
 2017 Thailand 135lbs Champion

Awards
 2017 Sports Writers Association of Thailand Fighter of the Year

Fight record

|- style="background:#fbb;"
| 2023-03-17|| Loss ||align=left| Muangthai PKSaenchaimuaythaigym || ONE Friday Fights 9 || Bangkok, Thailand || KO (Elbow) || 3 ||1:37
|-  style="background:#cfc;"
| 2023-01-27|| Win ||align=left| Sangmanee Sor Tienpo ||  ONE Lumpinee 2 || Bangkok, Thailand || Decision (Unanimous) || 3 || 3:00
|-  style="background:#fbb"
| 2022-10-01 || Loss ||align=left| Yodlekpet Or.Achariya  || Muay Thai Vithee TinThai + Kiatpetch || Buriram province, Thailand || Decision || 5 || 3:00
|-  style="background:#fbb"
| 2022-08-13 ||Loss ||align=left| Rambolek Tor.Yotha  || Ruamponkon Samui, Petchbuncha Stadium || Ko Samui, Thailand || Decision || 5 ||3:00 
|-  style="background:#cfc"
| 2022-06-20 || Win||align=left| Kongklai AnnyMuayThai  || U-Muay RuamJaiKonRakMuayThai + Palangmai, Rajadamnern Stadium || Bangkok, Thailand || Decision || 5 ||3:00 
|-  style="background:#cfc"
| 2022-05-09 || Win||align=left| Siwagorn Kiatjaroenchai || Satun Super Fight || Satun province, Thailand ||  Decision || 5 ||3:00 
|-  style="background:#fbb;"
| 2022-04-16|| Loss ||align=left| Petchmanee Por.Lakboon|| Sor.Sommai + Pitaktham|| Phayao province, Thailand || Decision || 5 ||3:00 
|-  style="background:#fbb;"
| 2021-11-26|| Loss ||align=left|  Yodlekpet Or.Achariya || Muaythai Moradok Kon Thai + Rajadamnern Super Fight || Buriram, Thailand || Decision || 5 || 3:00 
|-
! style=background:white colspan=9 |
|-  style="background:#cfc;"
| 2021-10-03|| Win ||align=left| Saeksan Or. Kwanmuang || Channel 7 Stadium || Bangkok, Thailand || Decision || 5 || 3:00
|-  style="background:#fbb;"
| 2021-04-28 || Loss ||align=left| Saemapetch Fairtex || ONE Championship: Full Blast || Singapore || KO (Straight to the body) || 1  || 2:12
|-  style="background:#cfc;"
| 2020-12-08|| Win ||align=left| Shadow Thor.Thepsutin || Lumpinee Birthday Show, Lumpinee Stadium || Bangkok, Thailand || KO (left hook) || 2 ||
|-  style="background:#fbb;"
| 2020-08-28|| Loss ||align=left| Rodlek P.K. Saenchaimuaythaigym || ONE Championship: A New Breed || Bangkok, Thailand || Decision (Unanimous) || 3 || 3:00
|-  style="background:#cfc;"
| 2020-07-31|| Win ||align=left| Sangmanee Sor Tienpo || ONE Championship: No Surrender 3 || Bangkok, Thailand || KO (Left Cross) || 1 ||2:45
|-  style="background:#fbb;"
| 2019-10-05||Loss||align=left| Nuenglanlek Jitmuangnon || Yod Muay Thai Naikhanomton || Buriram, Thailand || TKO (Knees to the Body)|| 4 ||
|-  style="background:#cfc;"
| 2019-09-06|| Win ||align=left| Bobo Sacko || ONE Championship: Immortal Triumph || Ho Chi Minh City, Vietnam || Decision (Unanimous) || 3 ||3:00
|-  style="background:#cfc;"
| 2019-06-26|| Win ||align=left| Shadow Suanaharnpeekmai || RuamponkonSamui + Kiatpetch Super Fight || Surat Thani, Thailand || Decision || 5 || 3:00
|-  style="background:#cfc;"
| 2019-05-10|| Win ||align=left| Nuenglanlek Jitmuangnon || Lumpinee Stadium || Bangkok, Thailand || Decision || 5 || 3:00
|-  style="background:#cfc;"
| 2019-03-19|| Win ||align=left| Ferrari Jakrayanmuaythai || Lumpinee Stadium || Bangkok, Thailand || Decision || 5 || 3:00
|-
! style=background:white colspan=9 |
|-  style="background:#fbb;"
| 2019-02-12|| Loss ||align=left| Nuenglanlek Jitmuangnon || Lumpinee Stadium || Bangkok, Thailand || KO (Right high kick) || 4 || 
|-  bgcolor="#cfc"
|-  style="background:#fbb;"
| 2018-11-08|| Loss ||align=left| Tawanchai PK Saenchaimuaythaigym || Lumpinee Stadium || Bangkok, Thailand || Decision || 5 || 3:00 
|-  bgcolor="#cfc"
|-  style="background:#fbb;"
| 2018-10-05|| Loss ||align=left| Tawanchai PK Saenchaimuaythaigym || Muay Thai Expo: The Legend of Muay Thai || Buriram, Thailand || Decision || 5 || 3:00 
|-  bgcolor="#cfc"
|-  style="background:#fbb;"
| 2018-09-07|| Loss ||align=left| Tawanchai PK Saenchaimuaythaigym || Lumpinee Stadium || Bangkok, Thailand || Decision || 5 || 3:00
|-  bgcolor="#cfc"
|-  style="background:#cfc;"
| 2018-07-06 || Win ||align=left| Muangthai PKSaenchaimuaythaigym || Samui Super Fight || Koh Samui, Thailand || TKO (Left cross) || 3 || 1:15
|-  style="background:#c5d2ea;"
| 2018-06-05|| Draw ||align=left| Muangthai PKSaenchaimuaythaigym || Lumpinee Stadium || Bangkok, Thailand || Decision || 5 || 3:00
|-  bgcolor="#cfc"
|-  style="background:#cfc;"
| 2018-05-01|| Win ||align=left| Nuenglanlek Jitmuangnon || Lumpinee Stadium || Bangkok, Thailand || Decision || 5 || 3:00
|-  style="background:#cfc;"
| 2018-04-01|| Win ||align=left| Darky Sawansangmanja || Channel 7 Stadium || Bangkok, Thailand || Decision || 5 || 3:00
|-  style="background:#cfc;"
| 2018-02-18|| Win ||align=left| Genji Umeno || Rebels 54 || Tokyo, Japan || KO (Left cross)|| 4 || 
|-  bgcolor="#cfc"
! style=background:white colspan=9 |
|-  style="background:#fbb;"
| 2017-11-07 || Loss ||align=left| Muangthai PKSaenchaimuaythaigym || Petchkiatpetch Fight, Lumpinee Stadium || Bangkok, Thailand || Decision || 5 || 3:00
|-  style="background:#fbb;"
|-  style="background:#cfc;"
| 2017-09-08 || Win ||align=left| Phetganat MuDen || Lumpinee Stadium || Bangkok, Thailand || KO (Punches)|| 3 ||
|-  style="background:#fbb;"
! style=background:white colspan=9 |
|-  style="background:#c5d2ea;"
| 2017-08-13 || Draw ||align=left| Phetganat MuDen || Channel 7 Stadium || Bangkok, Thailand || Decision || 5 || 3:00 
|-  style="background:#fbb;"
|-  style="background:#cfc;"
| 2017-07-14 || Win ||align=left| Pinphet Sitjadaeng || Lumpinee Stadium || Bangkok, Thailand || KO (Left cross)|| 3 ||
|-  style="background:#cfc;"
| 2017-05-07 || Win ||align=left| Pinphet Sitjadaeng || Channel 7 Stadium || Bangkok, Thailand || Decision || 5 || 3:00
|-  style="background:#cfc;"
| 2017-04-05 || Win ||align=left| Petchmahachon Jitmuangnon ||  || Thailand || Decision|| 5 || 3:00
|-  style="background:#cfc;"
| 2017-02-12 || Win ||align=left| Desellek MU-Den || Channel 7 Stadium || Bangkok, Thailand || KO (Left cross)|| 3 ||
|-  style="background:#cfc;"
| 2017-01-08 || Win ||align=left| Talaydam Sor Kitrongrot|| Channel 7 Stadium || Bangkok, Thailand || KO || 3 ||
|-  style="background:#cfc;"
| 2016-09-18 || Win ||align=left| Chamuakphet Sor. Sakunthong|| Channel 7 Stadium || Bangkok, Thailand || KO (Flying knee)|| 2 ||
|-  style="background:#cfc;"
| 2016-08-07 || Win ||align=left| Petaek Kiat WorSurin || Channel 7 Stadium || Bangkok, Thailand || Decision|| 5 || 3:00
|-  style="background:#cfc;"
| 2016-06-26 || Win ||align=left| Aikphipop Mor.Krungthepthonburi || Channel 7 Stadium || Bangkok, Thailand || KO (Left elbow) || 3 ||
|-  style="background:#cfc;"
| 2016-05-29 || Win ||align=left| Konglai Kaewsamrit || Channel 7 Stadium || Bangkok, Thailand || KO (Body punch + knee) || 2 ||
|-  style="background:#cfc;"
| 2016-04-24 || Win ||align=left| Petch Tor.Thepsuthin || Channel 7 Stadium || Bangkok, Thailand || KO (Left cross) || 2 ||
|-  style="background:#cfc;"
| 2016-04-20 || Win ||align=left| Suntos Tanbangsean || Channel 7 Stadium || Bangkok, Thailand || KO || 3 ||
|-  style="background:#fbb;"
| 2016-01-07 || Loss ||align=left| Nopakao Sitjepin || Channel 7 Stadium || Bangkok, Thailand || Decision || 5 || 3:00
|-  style="background:#cfc;"
| 2015-10-04 || Win ||align=left| Mantongkam Sitpanancheong ||  || Nonthaburi, Thailand || KO || 2 ||
|-  style="background:#cfc;"
| 2015-09-04 || Win ||align=left| Mongkolchai Chonburi || Lumpinee Stadium || Bangkok, Thailand || Decision|| 5 || 3:00
|-
| colspan=9 | Legend:

Professional boxing record

References

1998 births
Living people
Kulabdam Sor.Jor.Piek-U-Thai
ONE Championship kickboxers